Club Sportivo y Social Sol de América is a football club from Formosa, Argentina. They currently play in the regionalised third level of football in Argentina, in zone 3 of the Torneo Federal A.

References

External links

Football clubs in Formosa Province
Association football clubs established in 1947
1947 establishments in Argentina
Formosa, Argentina